Jamaica Blue is a franchise business of Foodco which operates small coffee shops throughout Australia, New Zealand, UK, China, Malaysia, Singapore and United Arab Emirates. The company mainly operates businesses in residential areas, malls, airports, hospitals and high streets. In 2012, the first Jamaica Blue cafe opened in Singapore, in that same year the cafe celebrated its 20th anniversary. Jamaica Blue has around 134 cafés internationally in 7 different countries. It has opened its 100th store in Australia on 16 October 2014, with the 100th café opened in the new development of Westfield Miranda. Jamaica Blue is the sister company of Muffin Break, which is also a franchise of Foodco

Awards 
The Jamaica Blue brand have received a number of achievements since beginning their operations:

 In 2019, rated “High Performers” by FRANdata – the independent Australian Franchise Rating Scale. Ratings are given after an independent and fact-based examination.  
 In 2019, Jamaica Blue were awarded as the QSR Winner of the Best Brand Transformation
 In 2017, Jamaice Blue was the Golden Bean Roaster's Competition GOLD Winner for the Overall Large Franchise Champion  
 In 2017, QSR announced Jamaica Blue as the recipient of the Best Franchise Partner Engagement Award
 In 2016, Jamaice Blue won QSR's Best Innovation – Food & Beverage
 In 2016, QSR also named Jamaica Blue as the Best Franchise Network Support

Community Support 
The City of Wanneroo, working with Alzheimer's WA, Jamaica Blue and Ocean Keys Shopping Centre, will join the growing network of memory cafes at the end of September 2020.

“Memory cafes help reduce stigma and promote a society that enables and supports people living with dementia to remain active in the community rather than be confined within the four walls of their home,” said Alzheimer's WA chief executive, Maria Davison.

In 2020, Jamaica Blue together with their sister company, Muffin Break, raised over $90,000 to assist those affected by the devastating bushfires within Australia by donating to the Australian Red Cross Bush Fire Appeal.

Controversies 
In November 2020, Former journalist and Labor candidate Ali France made headlines after the Jamaica Blue Indooroopilly store appeared to discriminate against her due to her disabilities, Jamaica Blue have so far refused to address media regarding this.

References

Further reading
 
 
 
 
 

Coffeehouses and cafés in Australia
Coffeehouses and cafés in the United Kingdom
Franchises
Restaurants established in 1992
1992 establishments in Australia